New Taipei City Constituency II includes Wugu, Luzhou, and part of Sanchong in New Taipei City. The district was formerly known as Taipei County Constituency II (2008-2010) and acquired its present boundaries since 2008, when all local constituencies of the Legislative Yuan were reorganized to become single-member districts.

Current district
 Wugu
 Luzhou
 Sanchong: 1 sub-district
 Dongqu: 16 urban villages
 Fugui, Bihua, Renhua, Yongqing, Yongshun, Fufu, Bihua, Cihui, Ci'ai, Yongfu, Cisheng, Cifu, Ciyou, Fuhua, Wuhua, Wufu

Legislators

Election results

 
 
 
 
 
 
 
 

2008 establishments in Taiwan
Constituencies in New Taipei